Fernand Moret (15 January 1905 – 1982) was a Swiss water polo player. He competed at the 1924 Summer Olympics and the 1928 Summer Olympics.

References

External links
 

1905 births
1982 deaths
Swiss male water polo players
Olympic water polo players of Switzerland
Water polo players at the 1924 Summer Olympics
Water polo players at the 1928 Summer Olympics
Place of birth missing